Beacon Hill is an   Local Nature Reserve in Rottingdean, on the eastern outskirts of Brighton in East Sussex. It is owned and managed by Brighton and Hove Council.

This chalk grassland site has extensive views out to sea and inland. Flora include round-headed rampion and several species of orchid, while there are birds such as skylarks. Rottingdean Windmill is a grade II listed building towards the south of the site.

References

Local Nature Reserves in East Sussex